"Smile" is a song by Nigerian singer Wizkid featuring American R&B singer H.E.R. It was released as the lead single off Wizkid's fourth studio album Made in Lagos on 16 July 2020. The song made its debut at No. 3 in the first week of launch of the UK Afrobeats Singles Chart, and was featured on Barack Obama's 2020 summer playlist.

Background
Wizkid had been very active on social media, sending tweets to generate hype (for more than two years) about his fourth studio album, Made in Lagos. Prior to the release of Smile, Wizkid released a cryptic message on his Instastory praising several artists and producers that worked with him on the album. He wrapped up by posting his birth date, giving fans the impression that would be his album's release date. Instead, he released the song as a celebration of life, dedicating it to his three children.

Accolades
MTV Africa Music Awards 2021 

|-
|2021
| "Smile"
| Best Collaboration 
|

Net Honours

Charts

References

2020 singles
2020 songs
H.E.R. songs
Wizkid songs
Songs written by Wizkid
Songs written by H.E.R.